Emil Bejmo (born October 10, 1989) is a Swedish professional ice hockey forward. He is currently playing for Manglerud Star in the Fjordkraftligaen (Norway).

Playing career
During the 2006–07 season, Bejmo played three games with Färjestads BK in the Swedish Hockey League. The rest of the season has he played with the club's U18 team. Bejmo was eligible for the 2008 NHL Entry Draft, however went undrafted.

On March 21, 2014, having played the tail end of the 2013–14 season on loan from Asplöven HC with Mora IK, his move was made permanent on a three-year contract.

References

External links

1989 births
Living people
Asplöven HC players
Bofors IK players
Borås HC players
Färjestad BK players
Manglerud Star Ishockey players
Mora IK players
Södertälje SK players
SønderjyskE players
Stjernen Hockey players
Swedish ice hockey forwards
Sportspeople from Karlstad